Dimitrios Zografakis (born 3 August 1978) is a Greek former professional footballer who played as a midfielder.

Zografakis started his career at amateur football club FC Orfeas Eleftheroupolis. at the age of 20, Dimitrios signed with Skoda Xanthi and played for the team for seven years. In 2005 Zografakis spent ten months at PAOK. While playing for the club from Thessaloniki he made one appearance during the group stage of the UEFA Cup against Shakhtar Donetsk. After that he played for Panionios, AEK Larnaca and Ionikos FC. On 8 January 2009, Zografakis signed with Bulgarian side FC Vihren Sandanski. He made his team debut a few days later, in a friendly match against Lokomotiv Plovdiv.

References

External links
 Profile at footmercato.net

1978 births
Living people
Association football midfielders
Greek footballers
Xanthi F.C. players
PAOK FC players
Panionios F.C. players
AEK Larnaca FC players
Ionikos F.C. players
OFC Vihren Sandanski players
Super League Greece players
First Professional Football League (Bulgaria) players
Cypriot First Division players
Cypriot Second Division players
PAEEK players
Greek expatriate footballers
Greek expatriate sportspeople in Bulgaria
Expatriate footballers in Bulgaria
Greek expatriate sportspeople in Cyprus
Expatriate footballers in Cyprus
Footballers from Kavala